Varakļāni parish is an administrative unit of Varakļāni Municipality, Latvia.

Towns, villages and settlements of Varakļāni parish 
  -parish administrative center
 
 Varakļāni

See also 
Varakļāni Palace

References 

Parishes of Latvia
Varakļāni Municipality